Speigle Heights is a neighborhood just northwest of downtown Lexington, Kentucky, United States. It is sometimes referred to as Irishtown. Its boundaries are Manchester Street to the north, Pine Street to the east, High Street/Versailles Road to the south, and Forbes Road to the west.

Neighborhood statistics
 Population in 2000: 420
 Land area: 0.133
 Population density: 3,157
 Median income: $22,397

References

Neighborhoods in Lexington, Kentucky